Bagli is a town and a nagar panchayat in the Malwa region of Dewas district  in the state of Madhya Pradesh, India.

Demographics
As of the 2011 Census of India, Bagli had a population of 10,310. Males constitute 51% of the population and females 49%. Bagli has an average literacy rate of 79.94%, higher than state average of 69.32%. Male literacy is around 87.86% while female literacy rate is 71.63%.

Geography
One of the most important rivers of MP & Rajasthan, Kali Sindh, flows through the south of the town.

It is the largest tehsil of Dewas district. Parts of Vindhya Range are seen in and around Bagli.

Religion
The Hindu temple of Jata-Shankar dedicated to Lord Shiva is located at the outskirts of the city. People from all over the state visit this religious site.

History
The name "Bagli" comes from the Hindi word "Bagh", meaning "tiger". In the years after the 1857 revolt in  India, it was merged with the Gwalior state. Bagli was one of the petty  states under the Indore  agency. It is situated 36 miles to the east of Indore. The chiefs of Bagli belong to the Jodhpur family of Rathore Rajputs, the state was founded by Thakor ur Gokul Das who was originally and subsequently an adherent of both Malhar Rao Holkar and Ranoji Scindia. Thakor Gokul Das had four sons - Beri Sal, Bharat Singh, Sher Singh and Salam Singh of whom Salam Singh was in position of Bagli state on the occasion of the settlement of Malwa by Sir John Malcolm in 1819 AD. Salam Singh was successfully followed by his son and grandson Bhim Singh and Kishore Singh respectively. Then, later at his death left his second son incharge of the estate. Thakor Raghunath Singh grandson of Kishore Singh who followed him, died suddenly in the year 1896 AD and was succeeded by his son Thakor Ranjit Singh. The chief had received his education at Daly College, Indore. The installation ceremony of the chief was performed by Captain LS Newmarch, who was the first assistant to the agent of the Governor General in India. 1897 AD since that time Raja Ranjit Singh had been conducting the affairs of his estate.  Raja Sajjan Singh younger brother of Raja Ranjit Singh succeeded him till the eve of independence.

Language
The most spoken language of Bagli is Malwi, a local dialect spoken in Malwa region of Madhya Pradesh.

References

Cities and towns in Dewas district